Luis de Zulueta y Escolano (1878–1964) was a Spanish Republican politician, pedagogue and diplomat. He was linked to the Institución Libre de Enseñanza. He served as Minister of State from 1931 to 1933, during the Second Republic.

Biography 
Born on 8 April 1878 in Barcelona to a well-off family, son of Juan Antonio Zulueta y Fernández and María
Dolores Escolano y de la Peña. He was of Cuban descent on his father side and Gaditan on his mother side. Zulueta, a native Spanish speaker, never got to fully dominate the Catalan language. His father (who died in 1894) was a prominent lawyer, linked to the local banking industry. After the decease of the former, Zulueta interrupted his secondary education studies to work as bank clerk.

Since 1903 he shared letters with Miguel de Unamuno who encouraged him to travel to Geneva and Paris. After a spell in Berlin, he returned to Spain in 1905. He was elected as Barcelona municipal councillor in 1905, running within the Alejandro Lerroux's Fraternidad Republicana platform, yet he disengaged from the commitment to the party and moved away from Barcelona. He met Francisco Giner de los Ríos (founder and leading figure of the Institución Libre de Enseñanza), for whom he served as interlocutor until 1910, as Giner de los Ríos sought to cultivate the cultural and political bridges between Barcelona and Madrid. After starting studies in Philosophy and Letters at the University of Salamanca, he earned the licentiate degree from the Central University in Madrid in 1906. He would later earn a PhD from the same centre in 1910, reading a dissertation titled La pedagogía de Rousseau y la educación de las percepciones de espacio y de tiempo ("Rousseau's pedagogy and the education of the perceptions of space and time").

He was attracted by the Republican-Socialist Conjunction in 1910. Linked to the Institución Libre de Enseñanza, Zulueta joined the Republican Reformist Party led by Gumersindo de Azcárate by 1914. His political ideas oscillated in between regenerationism, the left-wing, and a moderate liberalism. He would become an opponent of marxism-leninism. In 1910, he was appointed as lecturer of the Central University, where he would later obtain the chair of Pedagogy.

For the rest of the Restoration, Zulueta was elected a number of times to the Congress of Deputies in representation of Barcelona (1910), Madrid (1919), and Redondela (1923).

He was one of the intellectuals who signed the Manifesto for the Unión Democrática Española para la Liga de la Sociedad de Naciones Libres ("Spanish Democratic Union for the Society of the League of Free Nations"), published in 1918.

Following the proclamation of the Spanish Second Republic in April 1931, he was proposed as Ambassador to the Holy See by the Provisional Government, but the Vatican rejected the Agrément because he was a disciple of Giner de los Ríos. His application had counted with the endorsement of Francisco Vidal y Barraquer, the Archbishop of Tarragona, and by Federico Tedeschini, the Apostolic Nuncio in Madrid. He was elected to the constituent Cortes at the June 1931 election in representation of Badajoz.

Following the exit of the Radical Republican Party from the government, Zulueta (still not a member of Republican Action) was appointed as Minister of State by Manuel Azaña in December 1931, replacing Alejandro Lerroux. After Zulueta's exit from the ministry in June 1933, he was destined as Spanish Ambassador to Nazi Germany, where he barely served for three months. Years later, he wrote the memoirs of his brief spell in Berlin, "Mis recuerdos del Führer" (1954), leaving a portrait of Adolf Hitler and the pervasive manipulation techniques of nazism. Following the exit of Azaña from the premiership, Zulueta joined Republican Action (he had not been a member until then).

He was again appointed as Ambassador to the Holy See after the 1936 general election, and this time the Vatican accepted him.

Zulueta was forced out from the Palazzo di Espagna in Rome by Francoists upon the beginning of the Spanish Civil War and decided to go in exile, moving to Paris. He was later offered a place in Colombia by President Eduardo Santos.

He decided to move to the United States in 1960, and died in New York City on 2 August 1964.

References 
Citations

Bibliography
 
 
 
 
 
 
 
 
 

1878 births
1964 deaths
Complutense University of Madrid alumni
Academic staff of the Complutense University of Madrid
Government ministers during the Second Spanish Republic
Members of the Congress of Deputies of the Spanish Restoration
Members of the Congress of Deputies of the Second Spanish Republic
Foreign ministers of Spain
Ambassadors of Spain to the Holy See
Ambassadors of Spain to Germany
Spanish republicans
Education in Spain
Exiled Spanish politicians